Shawn Lee Chuang Rui (born 11 February 1990), is a Singaporean who formerly worked as an actor. He first came into prominence for his award-winning performance alongside his friend and co-star Joshua Ang in the box office hit I Not Stupid. and its sequel, I Not Stupid Too.

Career
Lee was one of four child actors who successfully auditioned for the child lead roles in Jack Neo's hit film I Not Stupid. His performance in the sitcom adaptation earned him a nomination for the Best Young Talent award, which he won, along with co-stars Joshua Ang and Eric Huang at the 2002 Star Awards. He would go on to star alongside them in three more of Neo's films. He filmed his last movie in 2007 before leaving the industry to concentrate on his A Levels. 

Lee made a brief return to acting in Neo's new film We Not Naughty, which was released in conjunction with Chinese New Year 2012 and features former I Not Stupid co-stars Joshua Ang and Xiang Yun.

Personal life 
Lee studied at Unity Primary School, Bukit Panjang Government High School and subsequently completed his A Levels at Anglo-Chinese Junior College. Lee is currently studying business at the National University of Singapore.

Filmography

Films

Television

Awards and nominations

References

External links

Profile on J-Team website

1990 births
Singaporean people of Chinese descent
Anglo-Chinese Junior College alumni
Living people
Singaporean male film actors
Singaporean male television actors
21st-century Singaporean male actors